Dhoom 3 is the soundtrack album for 2013 action thriller film of the same name which was written and directed by Vijay Krishna Acharya and produced by Aditya Chopra, who also co-wrote the story and also serves as the third instalment of the Dhoom franchise and a sequel to Dhoom and Dhoom 2. The film cinematography was handled by Sudeep Chatterjee while editing was done by Ritesh Soni and starred Aamir Khan, Abhishek Bachchan and Katrina Kaif in the lead roles. The film's soundtrack was composed by Pritam while the film's score was composed by Julius Packiam.

Development
It was announced that the composer of Dhoom and Dhoom 2; Pritam, would return once again to compose the music of the third instalment. Earlier reports suggested that Shefali Alvares had been roped to sing the Dhoom title track, but this turned out to be a rumour. Aamir said in a statement that the title track "Dhoom Machale Dhoom" is dedicated to Sachin Tendulkar who was then playing his 200th and final test match at the Wankhede Stadium. The song "Bande Hain Hum Uske" was sung by Shankar Mahadevan's 12-year-old son Shivam Mahadevan and Anish Sharma. His elder son Siddharth Mahadevan sung the song "Malang" in the film along with Shilpa Rao.

Release
The title song's video featuring Katrina Kaif and sung by Aditi Singh Sharma was unveiled on 14 November 2013. The first look of the song "Malang" was revealed on 25 November 2013. A teaser for "Dhoom Tap" featured Aamir Khan tap dancing to beats, along with background dancers. It was unveiled on 3 December 2013. A teaser for the song "Kamli", featuring Katrina Kaif and sung by Sunidhi Chauhan was revealed on 6 December 2013. The title song "Dhoom Machale" was also recorded in an Arabic version sung by Lebanese singer Naya. A Spanish version of "Dhoom Machale" song sung by Mia Mont was released by Yashraj Films on 4 January 2014.

Track listing

Reception
The music of Dhoom 3 received a mixed critical reception. Joginder Tuteja of Rediff.com noted, "There are songs like 'Tu Hi Junoon', 'Malang' and 'Kamli' that round off Dhoom 3 beautifully." Koimoi reported, "Overall it might not be the best album Pritam has come up with, but two really interesting compositions make the album scrupulous me! A noteworthy effort for sure!" The predictions turned out to be true as the album topped the iTunes charts only after the release of the film. Rohit Khilnani of India Today deemed the music "below average".

Records
The songs "Kamli" and "Dhoom Machale" topped the iTunes singles chart.

References

Hindi film soundtracks
2013 soundtrack albums